The ancient board game of Go was one of the 5 mind sports which featured at the inaugural World Mind Sports Games,  held in Beijing, China  in October 2008. There were six gold medals in Go events, within thirty-five gold medals vied for by 2,763 competitors (560 of whom were Go players), from 143 countries.

One feature of this Go games is that it was the first time in history an international tournament of professional Go used the Proposed Rules of Go conceived by Toshio Ikeda (1923-1974).

  This was deemed as an important trial of unifying the rules of Go.

About the rules 
There are no unified rules of Go.  The two major scoring systems are so-called scoring by area and scoring by territory.  Toshio Ikeda, a Japanese electrical engineer then working for Fujitsu, began his study on the rules in late 1960s, and published his work by a book On The Rules Of Go.  Ikeda argued that the Chinese rules of Go, which use scoring by area, are almost perfect, except for one drawback, which was shown in an example named "the problem of reinforcing".  In fact, the focus issue is, how to define "the last competitive move".  Ikeda found the solution, that is, to redefine the end of the game, and neutralize the value of the last move.

Ikeda died in 1974.  In 1990s, Chen Zu-yuan, a Chinese engineer and amateur Go player, published his study on the rules of Go by a book, in which he introduced Ikeda's work to Chinese readers. Chen does not like Ikeda's design, but after years of pondering, Chen made a compromise and proposed to WMSG to use this design in the inaugural 2008 games.

Medal table 
Under the auspices of the International Go Federation 560 players participated in six medal events in Beijing. South Korea won half of the 18 medals and all were swept by competitors from Eastern Asia.

Events 
Note that the sections below show only the latter stages of the competition, after the qualifying rounds.

Men's Individual

up to 5 players per team.

Women's Individual

up to 3 players per team.

Open

Men's team

5 players with 1 substitute per team. (5 separate games per round, team with 3+ game wins wins).

Women's team

3 players with 1 substitute per team. (3 separate games per round, team with 2+ game wins wins the round).

Pair Go

1 male-female pair playing alternate moves without consultation
Moves sequenced: black female, white female, black male, white male.

See also 
Go at the 2012 World Mind Sports Games

Notes

References

External links 
 
 
 
 
 
 
 
 

International Go competitions
2008 World Mind Sports Games
2008 in go